Pwani means "Coast" in Swahili. It may refer to:
Pwani Province, Kenya
Pwani Region, Tanzania
Pwani (village), village in Zanzibar, Tanzania